The Beretta 92s are full size pistols. The following is a list of 54 Beretta 92 models and the 93, 96, 98 and 99 models which are based on it.

Chambered for 9 x 19mm (9mm Luger)

Chambered for .40 S&W

Chambered for 9 x 21mm IMI

Chambered for 7.65mm Luger 

Beretta pistols